Track Stars may refer to:

 "Track Star" (song), an R&B/trap song by Mooski
 Track Stars, a Thomas the Tank Engine pictureback book
 Track Stars, a 2006 Thomas & Friends video release

See also
 The Trak Starz, an American hip-hop production duo
 Trackstarz, a production team known for their 2011 cover of the song Grenade
 Stars of Track and Field